Adventure Sports Center International is an Olympic standard white water rafting and canoe/kayak slalom center located on the mountaintop above the Wisp Ski Resort at Deep Creek Lake, McHenry, Maryland, United States.  In addition to serving as a venue for slalom races and training, the center offers a range of services to the general public including guided raft trips, inflatable kayak rentals, and riverboard rentals.

The center opened in May 2007, constructed at a cost of $24 million, and is the third pump-powered artificial whitewater facility built in North America. Its educational partner in water sports instruction is the Adventuresports Institute of nearby Garrett College, which offers degrees in outdoor adventure sports.

History
The concept of Adventure Sports Center International (ASCI) originated after the 1989 Whitewater Slalom World Championships on the remote Savage River in Western Maryland.  Sergi Orsi, then president of the International Canoe Federation encouraged the organizers of the 1989 Savage River event to build a pump-powered artificial whitewater course in a more accessible location nearby.  The Maryland state government supported the project to promote summer tourism in the region.

Since the Wisp Ski Resort already had a pump-filled mountaintop reservoir to supply its snowmaking machines with water in the winter, the artificial whitewater course was sited next to this reservoir to make use of its water in the summer.  The roads, motels, and restaurants which served the ski area in the winter made the location accessible to summer visitors.

In April, 2011, ASCI was chosen as the site for the 2014 World Championship slalom competition.  The races were held on September 16–21.  A number of modifications were made for the 2014 competition, including two boulder removals and several streambed changes.

Course Design

The course plans were drawn by the McLaughlin Whitewater Design Group, architects of the Ocoee Whitewater Center, which served as the canoe slalom venue for the 1996 Summer Olympics in Atlanta.  The Ocoee facility is the only Olympic whitewater venue built in a riverbed, using natural boulders to direct the water flow, and McLaughlin used a similar design here—with a channel shaped like a natural streambed and lined with natural boulders blasted from the mountaintop.  The purpose was both aesthetic and practical.  Irregular surfaces dampen the water surges that can occur in geometrically regular artificial channels. 

The first 100 meters of the course originally began with a stream-wide drop from the start pool and a split around a "Dark Destroyer" boulder in the middle of the stream.  However, in the winter of 2013 the top drop was narrowed and moved back into the start pool, reducing the slope, and the mid-stream boulder was removed.  The next three drops were modified with underwater speed bumps to slow down the water and reduce surges.  The first 100 meters remains the steepest and narrowest part of the course, but it is now more a pool-drop stream than a continuous rapid.  At any point swimmers can escape the current and swim ashore.

The last 280 meters of the course, starting at the lower bridge beyond the 300-meter competition section, is a practice area with easy put-in and take-out on either shore.  The last feature is a  spillway drop into the lower pool.  A conveyor belt carries boats and paddlers back to the start pool.

To create standing waves for freestyle (rodeo) competition, hydraulically adjustable wave shaping plates were placed under the water in six locations: two where pump-driven water enters the start pool, and one at the bottom of each of the four concrete-walled spillway drops.  Jimmy Blakeney, 2003 U.S. National Freestyle Kayak Champion, assisted in the final design of the wave shapers.

IFC Canoe Slalom World Championships
On December 11, 2012 Adventure Sports Center International's bid was selected in Paris, France and they became the official site for the IFC World Championships. In 2014, ASCI was the official venue of the 2014 IFC Canoe Slalom World Championships. The event was held from September 17 to 21, 2014. Events included were: men's and women's C1, men's and women's C2, men's and women's K1.

Gallery - Slalom gates and 2013 modifications

SuperShafty Fall Crawl - National Radio Control Truck Competition
On the weekend of October 19-21, 2018, Adventure Sports Center International's became the official site for the first SuperShafty Fall Crawl National level Radio Control Truck Competition. 

The pumps were turned off, and the water was drained for this event. 117 RC trucks were in attendance for 2018.

In 2019 the event was held from September 27-29th. Events included for 2018 and 2019 were: SORRCA Class 1, Class 2, Class 3 and a Ultra4 style foot race. 191 RC trucks were in attendance.

The 2020 event was held on October 1-4th. And included WRCCA and SORRCA style events, as well as the Ultra4 and Spotter Challenge. 320 RC trucks were in attendance.

References

External links

ASCI Official Website
Race Video 2010
Race Video 2008
2014 World Championship videos, CanoeLiveResults
2014 World Championship videos, Youtube Planet Canoe

Artificial whitewater courses
Canoeing and kayaking venues in the United States